Atkinsviridae is a family of RNA viruses, which infect prokaryotes.

Taxonomy 
Atkinsviridae contains 56 genera:

 Andhevirus
 Apihcavirus 
 Arihsbuvirus 
 Bahdevuvirus 
 Bilifuvirus 
 Blinduvirus 
 Cahtebovirus 
 Chinihovirus 
 Chounavirus 
 Cihsnivirus 
 Diydovirus 
 Dugnivirus 
 Firunevirus 
 Gohshovirus
 Hehspivirus 
 Helacdivirus 
 Hirvovirus 
 Huhmpluvirus 
 Huleruivirus 
 Hysdruvirus 
 Ichonovirus 
 Ipivevirus
 Isoihlovirus 
 Kempsvovirus 
 Kihrivirus 
 Kimihcavirus 
 Kudohovirus 
 Kuhfotivirus 
 Lahcomavirus 
 Lehptevirus 
 Lobdovirus 
 Madisduvirus 
 Mitdiwavirus 
 Moloevirus
 Monekavirus
 Nehujevirus 
 Neratovirus
 Niginuvirus 
 Pagohnivirus 
 Pihngevirus 
 Pohlydovirus 
 Psoetuvirus 
 Qeihnovirus 
 Rainacovirus 
 Scloravirus 
 Sdonativirus
 Sdribtuvirus
 Shopitevirus
 Stupavirus
 Tsecebavirus 
 Wahbolevirus 
 Wecineivirus 
 Whodehavirus 
 Wulosvivirus
 Yekorevirus
 Yeshinuvirus

References 

Virus families
Riboviria